Spalirisos, also spelled Spalirises, (Greek:  ,   (epigraphic); Kharosthi:) was an Iranian king who ruled Arachosia in the 1st century BCE.

Name
Spalarisos's name is attested on his coins in the Greek form  and in the Kharosthi form , which are derived from the Saka name , meaning "in command of army".

Career
Before his rise to kingship, he served as a commander of Vonones of Sakastan, who had minted coins with his name and that of another commander, Spalahores, who are both referred to as "brother of the king". Scholars such as R.C. Senior and Khodadad Rezakhani consider Spalirisos and Spalahores to indeed be Vonones' brothers, while others such as K.W. Dobbins argue that it was an honorific title given to them, whom he considered to be Saka satraps.

A major argument against the proposal of a blood relationship between Vonones and the two commanders was due to both of them having Saka names, contrary to Vonones' Parthian name. Saghi Gazerani has suggested that after the Arsacid re-conquest of Sakastan (sometime between 124–115 BC), which was given as a fiefdom to the Surenid general that led the expedition, the Surenids (who became independent after 88 BC) and Sakas became closely connected, presumably through alliances and intermarriages. Indeed, Parthians and Sakas are often mixed up in Indian literature. The mythological Iranian hero Rostam (who was from Sakastan), is mentioned in Iranian traditions as both Parthian and Saka, thus supporting this dual-identity.

Notes

References

Sources 
 
  

Indo-Scythian kings
1st-century BC Iranian monarchs
1st-century BC Iranian people